The 771st Bombardment Squadron is a former United States Army Air Forces unit.  The squadron was activated in 1943, and became one of the earliest Boeing B-29 Superfortress units.  It moved to the China Burma India Theater in April 1944 and participated in the first attack on the Japanese Home Islands since the 1942 Doolittle Raid in June 1944.  In August 1944, it earned a Distinguished Unit Citation.  It was inactivated on 12 October 1944, when the Army Air Forces reorganized its very heavy bomber groups to consist of three, rather than four squadrons.

History

Training in the United States
The squadron was first activated on 1 July 1943 at Smoky Hill Army Air Field, Kansas as one of the four original squadrons of the 462d Bombardment Group, and was intended to be one of the first units to fly the Boeing B-29 Superfortress.  Smoky Hill was one of four bases chosen for B-29 training based on their proximity to Boeing's factory at Wichita, Kansas, where most of the early Superfortresses would be produced.  However, no B-29s were available to equip the squadron.  It moved to Walker Army Air Field, Kansas at the end of the month.

At Walker, it received its initial cadre from elements of the 40th Bombardment Group and began to fly a mix of Martin B-26 Marauders and Boeing B-17 Flying Fortresses.  Delays in producing the B-29, labor disputes at the engine manufacturer,  and modifications to the planes to make them ready for combat resulted in belated deliveries to combat units and it was close to the end of 1943 before aircrews could train in the new bomber in any number.  Ground echelon personnel began shipping out in December 1943 to prepare the airfields for the bombers without completing their training in the United States.  The air echelon of the squadron trained with the B-29 at Walker until March 1944, when it departed for its first overseas base, Piardoba Airfield, Bengal, India, to participate in Operation Matterhorn, which called for B-29 attacks from advanced bases in China, while the bombers' main bases were in India.

Combat operations
The air echelon ferried its planes to India via Canada, across north Africa then to India.  Once all elements of the 462d Group had arrived at Piardoba in June, the squadron became part of Twentieth Air Force, which reported directly to Headquarters, Army Air Forces, bypassing theater command.  Initially, the squadron's bombers were used to airlift supplies over the Hump to forward bases in China, primarily to Chengtu.   It flew its first combat mission, an attack on rail targets in  Bangkok, Thailand on 5 June 1944 from its base in India.

Ten days later, the squadron took part in the first attack on the Japanese Home Islands since the 1942 Doolittle Raid.  Attacks on Japan required staging through forward bases in China, and it took twelve flights by the bombers to transport enough fuel and munitions to the forward bases to prepare for one attack sortie.  This limited attacks on Japan to one in ten days. However, the squadron attacked iron plants, aircraft factories, naval installations, transportation centers and other targets in Japan.  The squadron moved its available aircraft to the forward base at Chiung-Lai Airfield.  Staging of B-29s, already armed and loaded with bombs began on 13 June and was only completed on the day of the raid, with only refueling needed at Chiung-Lai.  The primary target for this mission was the Imperial Steel Works at Yawata.

The squadron also attacked targets in Burma, China, Formosa and Indonesia.  In August 1944, operating from China Bay Airport in Ceylon (now Sri Lanka), where the Royal Air Force provided support for the mission, it mined the Musi River in Sumatra, dropping down below a 1000 foot ceiling to sow the mines in Operation Boomerang. All petroleum products exported from the large refineries at Palembang were shipped via this stream.  On 20 August, the squadron again attacked iron and steel works in Yawata, Japan in a daylight raid for which it earned the Distinguished Unit Citation (DUC).  Fighter opposition on this attack included the first experience of a Japanese fighter plane intentionally ramming a B-29.

In October 1944, the 462d Bombardment Group was reorganized, along with other groups in XX Bomber Command.    Although this reorganization increased the number of aircraft assigned to each squadron and to the group, it reduced the number of squadrons in the group from four to three.  The squadron was inactivated in this reorganization and its crews and airplanes were distributed to the other three squadrons of the 462d Group.

Lineage
 Constituted 771st Bombardment Squadron (Heavy) on 19 May 1943
 Activated on 1 July 1943
 Redesignated 771st Bombardment Squadron, Very Heavy on November 1943
 Inactivated on 12 October 1944

Assignments
 462d Bombardment Group, 1 July 1943 – 12 October 1944

Stations
 Smoky Hill Army Air Field, Kansas, 1 July 1943
 Walker Army Air Field, Kansas, 28 July 1943 – c. 12 March 1944
 Piardoba Airfield, India, c. 16 April–12 October 1944

Aircraft
 Martin B-26 Marauder, 1943
 Boeing B-17 Flying Fortress, 1943–1944
 Boeing B-29 Superfortress, 1944

Awards and campaigns

See also

 List of B-29 Superfortress operators
 B-17 Flying Fortress units of the United States Army Air Forces
 List of Martin B-26 Marauder operators

References

Notes
 Explanatory notes

 Citations

Bibliography

 
 
 

Strategic bombing squadrons of the United States Army Air Forces
Military units and formations established in 1943